Tungsten(V) fluoride is an inorganic compound with the formula WF5. It is a hygroscopic yellow solid. Like most pentafluorides, it adopts a tetrameric structure, consisting of [WF5]4 molecules.  In this way, each W center achieves octahedral coordination.

Production
Tungsten(V) fluoride is produced by the reaction of tungsten and tungsten hexafluoride:
W + 5 WF6  →  6 WF5

At room temperature, it disproportionates to the tetra- and hexafluoride:
2 WF5  →  WF4  +  WF6

References

Tungsten halides
Fluorides